Vladimir Nikolayevich Kostyuk (born 28 May 1972) is a former Turkmenistani professional footballer.

Club career
He made his professional debut in the Soviet Second League in 1989 for Köpetdag Aşgabat.

Honours
 Russian Premier League bronze: 1992, 1993.

References

1972 births
Living people
Soviet footballers
Turkmenistan footballers
Association football midfielders
Turkmenistan international footballers
FK Köpetdag Aşgabat players
FC Dynamo Moscow players
Turkmenistan expatriate footballers
Expatriate footballers in Russia
Turkmenistan expatriate sportspeople in Russia
Russian Premier League players
FC Anzhi Makhachkala players